Sandeidfjorden is a fjord in Vindafjord municipality in Rogaland county, Norway. The village of Sandeid lies at the northern end of the fjord and the village of Vikedal lies on the eastern shore near the mouth of the fjord.

See also
 List of Norwegian fjords

References

Fjords of Rogaland
Vindafjord